The minister of agriculture and agri-food is a minister of the Crown in the Cabinet of Canada, who is responsible for overseeing several organizations including Agriculture and Agri-Food Canada, the Canadian Dairy Commission, Farm Credit Canada, the National Farm Products Council and the Canadian Grain Commission. 

The current minister of agriculture and agri-food is Marie-Claude Bibeau.

The post was established in 1995 as a successor to the minister of agriculture, a position that existed since Canadian Confederation in 1867.

List of ministers
Key:

See also
 Department of Agriculture and Agri-Food (Canada)

References

External links
 Department of Agriculture and Agri-Food (Canada)

Agriculture
Agriculture in Canada
Canada